Rich Kwame Amevor (born 6 September 1997) is an Australian rapper and record producer. He has released four EPs: Lesson Learned in 2017, Endless Conversations in 2018, Please, Get Home Safe in 2020 and Thatboykwame in 2022.

Early life
Rich Kwame Amevor was born to Ghanaian parents in Auckland, New Zealand, and migrated to Australia at the age of two with his family. Kwame grew up in Glenwood, in the Blacktown District, New South Wales of Western Sydney. He attended the same church as Ghanaian-Australian rapper Manu Crooks. He started making music at 16.

Career
Kwame first rose to prominence following a 2016 ASAP Ferg concert in The Metro Theatre, at which he was invited on stage to perform freestyle rap. Taking on Kwame as his professional name, he released his debut single "I Get It" in October 2016. In March 2017, he released his debut EP Lessons Learned, about which he said "I talk about things that I've dealt with... feeling low sometimes, like you're not worth anything, and I just pour that out through an artistic form in hopes that people will relate to it".

In March 2018, Kwame released his second EP, Endless Conversations. He said "Every track [is] a conversation in itself, as well as part of a bigger whole, like those undercurrents that are always there in relationships... Each track builds on the last, following a progression that gives form to the story as I explore the pressures of life and relationships as a creative".

Through Triple J Unearthed in 2018, Kwame won a competition to open Splendour in the Grass, and received the J Award for Unearthed Artist of the Year. In November 2018, his single "Clouds" was premiered by Zane Lowe on Beats 1.

In September 2019, he released "Stop Knockin' @ My Door", the lead single from his third EP. He supported a range of artists on tour, including Migos, 6lack, Skepta, AJ Tracey, Peking Duk, and Tkay Maidza.

In July 2022, Kwame formed group BBGB with BLESSED, B Wise, Manu Crooks and Lil Spacely. BBGB released their debut single "Tough Love" on 15 July 2022.

Musical style
His music has been described as having "the experimentalism of Brockhampton and the laid-back confidence of Vince Staples".

Discography

Extended plays

Singles

As lead artist

As featured artist

Awards and nominations

J Award

|-
| J Awards of 2018
|himself
| Unearthed Artist of the Year
|

References

Further reading

External links 

Australian male rappers
Australian people of Ghanaian descent
Living people
1997 births
Year of birth uncertain